Rhynchoferella is a genus of moths of the Copromorphidae family.

Species
Rhynchoferella hoppei Mey, 2007
Rhynchoferella kuehnei 	Mey, 2007
Rhynchoferella simplex Strand, 1915
Rhynchoferella syncentra (Meyrick, 1916)

References

 Mey, W., 2007, Esperiana - Lepidoptera Africana 4 - Memoir 4

Copromorphidae